Casemiro Mior is a Brazilian football manager and former footballer.

During his career as a footballer, he played for Grêmio, Internacional and Internacional de Limeira. He was infamously sent off in the 1989 Grenal of the Century while he was playing with Internacional against Gremio.

In 2002, Mior was appointed to be the head coach of Hong Kong.

He coached C.D. Nacional of Portugal for two seasons, from 2003-2005.

After that, he returned to his native Brazil to coach CA Paranaense and Avaí FC. 

In 2007, Mior was appointed to be the head coach of Hong Kong League XI to compete in 2007 Lunar New Year Cup. The team finished last after losing both matches after penalty shootout.

At the end of the 2006-07 Hong Kong First Division League season, during which he led South China to the title, Casemiro Mior was awarded the Best Coach of the Year.

He was fired as coach of Portuguese Liga side Belenenses on 7 October 2008, after he only managed to get 2 points in 5 matches.

Honours

Manager
Eastern
Hong Kong Senior Shield: 2007–08

South China
Hong Kong First Division: 1999–2000, 2006–07
Hong Kong Senior Shield: 1998–99, 1999–2000, 2001–02, 2006–07
Hong Kong FA Cup: 2006–07

Individual
Hong Kong First Division League Coach of the Year: 1999-00, 2001–02, 2006–07

References

1958 births
Living people
Footballers from Porto Alegre
Brazilian footballers
Association football forwards
Brazilian football managers
Grêmio Foot-Ball Porto Alegrense players
Sport Club Internacional players
Associação Atlética Internacional (Limeira) players
South China AA managers
Expatriate football managers in Hong Kong
Hong Kong national football team managers
C.D. Nacional managers
Brazilian expatriate sportspeople in Hong Kong
Brazilian people of German descent
Eastern Sports Club football managers
Avaí FC managers

Associação Atlética Internacional (Limeira) managers